Football Club de Chartres was a French association football club, based in Chartres.

History
The club was founded in 1989 as the result of a merger between Vélo Sport Chartrain and Sporting Club de Chartres. They are based in the town of Chartres and their home stadium is the Stade des Grands Pres. In May 2018, the club merged with Chartres Horizon to form C'Chartres Football.

References

Association football clubs established in 1989
1989 establishments in France
FC Chartres
Defunct football clubs in France
Association football clubs disestablished in 2018
2018 disestablishments in France
Sport in Eure-et-Loir
Football clubs in Normandy